Ferrate loosely refers to a material that can be viewed as containing anionic iron complexes. Examples include tetrachloroferrate ([FeCl4]2−), oxyanions, tetracarbonylferrate ([Fe(CO)4]2−), the organoferrates. The term ferrate derives from the Latin word for iron, ferrum.

References

Iron compounds
Anions
Ferrates